The Happy Warrior is a 1925 American silent drama film directed by J. Stuart Blackton and starring Malcolm McGregor, Alice Calhoun, and Mary Alden. The story had previously been turned into a 1917 British film of the same title.

Plot
As described in a film magazine review, the father of Ralph has secretly married, cutting the boy out of his inheritance. His Aunt Maggie grooms the boy to take possession of his title of nobleman and to evict the usurpers from the estate. To develop strength, the he joins the circus and roughs it. A boyhood enemy is overwhelmed by him when he becomes friends with the son of the usurpers. Later, the friendship with the son brings him to renounce all claims to the estate. He marries Dora, the daughter of the circus owner.

Cast

References

Bibliography
 Palmer, Scott. British Film Actors' Credits, 1895-1987. McFarland, 1998.

External links

1925 films
1920s sports drama films
American sports drama films
American boxing films
American silent feature films
Films directed by J. Stuart Blackton
Films set in England
Films based on British novels
American black-and-white films
1925 drama films
1920s English-language films
1920s American films
Silent American drama films
Silent sports drama films